Andreas Bang Brecke (14 September 1879 – 13 June 1952) was a Norwegian sailor who competed in the 1912 Summer Olympics and in the 1920 Summer Olympics.

In 1912 he was a crew member of the Norwegian boat Taifun, which won the gold medal in the 8 metre class. Eight years later he was part of the Norwegian boat Jo, which won the gold medal in the 6 metre class (1919 rating).

References

Sources

External links 
 
 

1879 births
1952 deaths
Norwegian male sailors (sport)
Olympic sailors of Norway
Olympic gold medalists for Norway
Olympic medalists in sailing
Medalists at the 1912 Summer Olympics
Medalists at the 1920 Summer Olympics
Sailors at the 1912 Summer Olympics – 8 Metre
Sailors at the 1920 Summer Olympics – 6 Metre